Ceratomerus is a genus of flies in the family Empididae.

Species

C. albistylus Hardy, 1930
C. athertonius Sinclair, 2003
C. attenuatus Sinclair, 2003
C. barringtonensis Sinclair, 2003
C. bickeli Sinclair, 2003
C. biseriatus Plant, 1991
C. brevifurcatus Plant, 1991
C. bulbosus Sinclair, 2003
C. campbelli (Paramonov, 1961)
C. campbelli (Paramonov, 1961)
C. connexus Collin, 1933
C. crassinervis Malloch, 1931
C. deansi Plant, 1995
C. dorsatus Collin, 1928
C. earlyi Plant, 1991
C. exiguus Collin, 1928
C. falcatus Sinclair, 2003
C. flavus Plant, 1991
C. globosus Sinclair, 2003
C. hibernus Sinclair, 2003
C. inflexus Hardy, 1930
C. lobatus Sinclair, 2003
C. longifurcatus Collin, 1931
C. macalpinei Sinclair, 2003
C. maculatus Sinclair, 2003
C. malleolus Sinclair, 2003
C. mediocris Collin, 1933
C. melaneus Plant, 1991
C. ordinatus Hardy, 1930
C. oreas Sinclair, 2003
C. orientalis Sinclair, 2003
C. paradoxus Philippi, 1865
C. prodigiosus Collin, 1928
C. tarsalis Plant, 1991
C. tuberculus Hardy, 1930
C. victoriae Sinclair, 2003
C. virgatus Collin, 1928
C. vittatus Plant, 1991

References

Empidoidea genera
Empididae
Diptera of South America
Diptera of Australasia
Taxa named by Rodolfo Amando Philippi